Keister (or Kiester) may refer to:

Keister

People
Individuals 
 Abraham Lincoln Keister (1852-1917), Republican member of the U.S. House
 Bill Keister (1871-1924), American baseball player
 George Keister was an American architect
 John Keister (comedian) (born 1956), American comedian and writer
 John Keister (footballer born 1970), Sierra Leonean international footballer currently playing for Margate
 John Keister (footballer born 1988), Sierra Leonean footballer currently at PK-37
 Shane Keister is an American musician.

Groups
 Keister Family Fiddlers - A musical group in Chestermere, Alberta, Canada

Places
 Keister, West Virginia, an unincorporated community

Buildings 
 Keister House, a house on the  U.S. National Register of Historic Places Virginia

Kiester

Places
 Kiester Township, Faribault County, Minnesota, USA
 Kiester Lake (Minnesota, USA)
 Kiester, Minnesota, USA; a city in Faribault County

Other uses 
 An alternative term for buttocks

See also
 John Keister (disambiguation)